Brigitte Marianne Levy Bodenheimer (September 27, 1912 – January 7, 1981) was a German American jurist. Specializing in family law, she was a professor at S.J. Quinney College of Law and UC Davis School of Law.

Born in Berlin to Ernst Levy and Zerline Wolff, Bodenheimer graduated from the University of Heidelberg in 1934. Being Jewish, she immigrated from Nazi Germany that same year and continued her legal education at Columbia Law School (where she met her husband Edgar Bodenheimer) and later University of Washington School of Law.

References

External links

Brigitte Bodenheimer at Geni.com

1912 births
1981 deaths
Jurists from Berlin
Jewish emigrants from Nazi Germany to the United States